Tla' Al-Ali is one of the districts  of Amman governorate, Jordan.

References 

 

Districts of Amman